The Battles of Oltu consisted of two battles; the first (18–25 June 1920) was a battle between Armenian troops and local Turkish militia in the Olti Okrug of Armenia. The second battle began on 3–5 September 1920, marking the beginning of the Turkish-Armenian War, and consisted of Turkish forces driving the Armenians out of district.

Background
World War I was over and the Ottoman Empire had lost.  The Russian Empire had come apart in the Russian Civil War with separate governments being formed in Georgia and Armenia.  The Treaty of Sèvres which established the new boundaries for the Ottoman Empire had not yet been signed. The district of Oltu, known then as Ardahan-Olty, was annexed by Russia in 1878,  Georgia assumed de jure authority over it when they claimed independence on May 26, 1918. Democratic Republic of Armenia (DRA) also assumed de jure authority over this region on May 28, 1918.

First battle
The conflict arose when the Democratic Republic of Georgia failed to maintain control over their westernmost province, the district of Oltu, and local Muslim militias assumed control in their stead. The local Turkish clans had skirmished with Armenian border troops, and as a result the local Armenian commander initiated a punitive expedition into the Oltu district. On 16 June 1920 Armenian forces invaded the Oltu district and annexed it to the DRA. Meanwhile, the Treaty of Sèvres was signed confirming the validity of the Armenian state, but giving Armenia much less territory than originally proposed by Woodrow Wilson.

Second battle
In August, the Armenian government attempted to occupy the Oltu district. In response, General Kâzım Karabekir led four Turkish battalions into the district on September 3 and drove the Armenians out. Karabekir then pushed into the Democratic Republic of Armenia on September 20 prompting the Armenian government to declare war on Turkey four days later. The Turkish–Armenian War ensued.

References

Oltu
Oltu
1920 in Armenia
1920 in the Ottoman Empire
History of Erzurum Province
June 1920 events
September 1920 events